Pozzilli is an Italian comune (municipality) of the Province of Isernia, in the region Molise, located about  west of Campobasso and about  southwest of Isernia.

Geography
Pozzilli is located on a valley below the Mainarde mountain range, next to the Abruzzo, Lazio and Molise National Park. It is crossed by the river Rava and is few km far from the town of Venafro. The industrial area extends into eastern plain and is part of the "Isernia-Venafro Industrial Consortium".

The municipal territory, bordering with the regions of Lazio and Campania, borders with the municipalities of Acquafondata, Capriati a Volturno, Conca Casale, Filignano, Montaquila, Monteroduni, Venafro, and Viticuso.

References

External links

 Pozzilli official website

Cities and towns in Molise